Deception Bay is a bay within Moreton Bay in the Moreton Bay Region, Queensland, Australia.  The bay is shallow.  It contains some seagrass beds.

Geography 

Deception Bay is in the most north-western part of Moreton Bay.

History 
In 1823, John Oxley originally named it Pumice Stone River believing it was a river because it was very shallow. Its present name refers Oxley being deceived by its appearance.

References

External links

 

Bays of Queensland
Moreton Bay